The 116th Street station was a local station on the demolished IRT Third Avenue Line in Manhattan, New York City. The outer tracks had two side platforms for local trains, and was built first. The center track was built as part of the Dual Contracts for express trains. This station closed on May 12, 1955, with the ending of all service on the Third Avenue El south of 149th Street.

References

 
 

IRT Third Avenue Line stations
Railway stations closed in 1955
1878 establishments in New York (state)
1955 disestablishments in New York (state)
Former elevated and subway stations in Manhattan

Third Avenue